Ulrik Schmidt (born 19 August 1962) is a Danish curler. He is the former skip for the Danish national team, and he threw third stones.

Schmidt's first international appearance was at the 1984 World Junior Curling Championships, where he skipped the Danish team to a 9th-place finish. He was then picked up by Sören Bang to play lead at the 1987 European Curling Championships, placing fourth. He was the team's alternate at the 1991 Euros, skipped by Gert Larsen, placing 6th.

Schmidt skipped his own team beginning in 1996. That season, he finished 5th at the European Championships and 6th at the 1997 Ford World Men's Curling Championship. Later that year, he won a silver medal at the 1997 European Championships, where he lost to Germany (skipped by Andy Kapp) in the final.

Schmidt didn't return to international competition until the 1999 Ford World Men's Curling Championship, where he placed 6th. Later in the year, he won another silver at the Euros, losing to Scotland this time in the final, skipped by Hammy McMillan. At the 2000 Ford World Men's Curling Championship, he placed 5th. In 2000, he won another European silver medal, losing to Finland (skipped by Markku Uusipaavalniemi) in the final. He did not play in the Worlds that season.  Schmidt was an alternate at the following European championship, for Lasse Lavrsen, who finished 6th.

Schmidt represented Denmark at the 2002 Winter Olympics, skipping the team to a 7th-place finish. At the 2002 Ford World Men's Curling Championship, he finished in 5th. He finished 5th at the 2002 European Championship as well. At the 2003 Ford World Men's Curling Championship, he finished 6th.

At the 2003 European Championship, Schmidt won his last international medal to date- a bronze medal. In 2004, he finished 6th and 2005 he finished 6th once again. He did not return to a World Championship until 2006, where he finished 8th. By this time, he was facing competition in his home country from Johnny Frederiksen. He teamed up with Frederiksen at the 2008 World Men's Curling Championship has his lead, finishing 9th. At the 2008 European Curling Championships, Schmidt would return as the team's skip, with Frederiksen as third. They finished in 5th. They switched positions for the 2009 Ford World Men's Curling Championship, but with Schmidt still holding the broom.

External links

2010 Olympics profile

Danish male curlers
1962 births
Living people
Curlers at the 2002 Winter Olympics
Sportspeople from Copenhagen
Olympic curlers of Denmark
Curlers at the 2010 Winter Olympics
Danish curling coaches
21st-century Danish people